Henry John Markram (born 28 March 1962) is a South African-born Israeli neuroscientist, professor at the École Polytechnique Fédérale de Lausanne (EPFL) in Switzerland and director of the Blue Brain Project and founder of the Human Brain Project.

Education
Henry Markram obtained his Bachelor of Science degree in physiology and the history and philosophy of science from the University of Cape Town, South Africa and his PhD in neurobiology from the Weizmann Institute of Science, Israel in 1991, under the supervision of Menahem Segal. During his PhD work, he discovered a link between acetylcholine and memory mechanisms by showing that acetylcholine modulates the primary receptor linked to synaptic plasticity.

Personal life 
Born in South Africa, Markram is now an Israeli citizen. Markram met his current wife, fellow neuroscientist Kamila Markram, at the Max Planck Institute for Brain Research in Frankfurt. They moved to the École Polytechnique Fédérale de Lausanne together and, in 2007, founded Frontiers Media. Markram has been married twice and has a total of five children, one of whom, Kai, is autistic.

Markram's biography "The Boy Who Felt Too Much," written by Lorenz Wagner, reveals a story about his relationship with his son, Kai.

Research
Following his PhD, Markram went to the United States as a Fulbright Scholar at the National Institutes of Health (NIH), where he studied ion channels on synaptic terminals with Elise F. Stanley. As a Minerva Fellow he then went to the Laboratory of Bert Sakmann at the Max Planck Institute, Heidelberg, Germany, where he along with his colleagues discovered calcium transients in dendrites evoked by sub-threshold activity, and by single action potentials propagating back into dendrites. He also began studying the connectivity between neurons, describing in great detail how layer 5 pyramidal neurons are interconnected.

Some of his work altered the relative timing of single pre- and post-synaptic action potentials to reveal a learning mechanism operating between neurons where the relative timing in the millisecond range affects the coupling strength between neurons. The importance of such timing has been reproduced in many brain regions and is known as spike timing-dependent synaptic plasticity (STDP).

Markram was appointed assistant professor at the Weizmann Institute of Science, where his group started systematically dissecting out the neocortical column. He along with his postdocs and PhD students discovered that synaptic learning can also involve a change in synaptic dynamics (called redistribution of synaptic efficacy) rather than merely changing the strengths of connections. He and his group also studied principles governing neocortical microcircuit structure, function, and emergent dynamics. Together with Wolfgang Maass he and his team developed the so-called  theory of liquid state machine, or high entropy computing.

In 2002, he moved to EPFL as full professor and founder/director of the Brain Mind Institute and Director of the Center for Neuroscience and Technology. At the BMI, in the Laboratory for Neural Microcircuitry, Markram continues to study the organisation of the neocortical column, develops tools to carry out multi-neuron patch clamp recordings combined with laser and electrical stimulation as well as multi-site electrical recording, chemical imaging and gene expression.

In 2013, the European Union funded the Human Brain Project, led by Markram, to the tune of $1.3 billion. Markram claimed that the project would create a simulation of the entire human brain on a supercomputer within a decade, revolutionising the treatment of Alzheimer's disease and other brain disorders. Less than two years into it, the project was recognised to be mismanaged and its claims overblown, and Markram was asked to step down.

On 8 October 2015, the Blue Brain Project published the first digital reconstruction and simulation of the micro-circuitry of a neonatal rat somatosensory cortex.

Selected publications
 1997: 
 1997: 
 2000: 
 2002: 
 2004: 
 2010: 
 2011: 
 2015:

See also 

 Javier de Felipe
 Blue Brain Project

References

External links

 

1962 births
Living people
Israeli scientists
Israeli neurologists
Israeli neuroscientists
Israeli people of South African descent
Academic staff of the École Polytechnique Fédérale de Lausanne
University of Cape Town alumni
Alumni of Kearsney College